The Aliso River is a small coastal river in the department of Haute-Corse, Corsica, France.

Course

It rises to the south of the  Cima di Grimaseta and flows northeast and then north to the Mediterranean Sea at Saint-Florent.
The river crosses the communes of Oletta, Olmeta-di-Tuda, Piève, Rapale, Sorio, Saint-Florent, San-Gavino-di-Tenda and Santo-Pietro-di-Tenda.

Hydrology

Measurements of the river flow were taken at the Oletta [Malpergo] station from 1972 to 1996.

Tributaries

The following streams (ruisseaux) are tributaries of the Aliso, ordered by length, and sub-tributaries:

 la Concia (9 km)
 Mercurio (2 km)
 Loto (2 km)
 Lenza Longa (2 km)
 Salinelle (8 km)
 Valdo (5 km)
 Campodata (4 km)
 Gué San Nicolao (4 km)
 Furmicaiola (4 km)
 Mondole Bianco (2 km)
 Vomera (2 km)
 Lenze (2 km)
 Cicendolle (3 km)
 Aghiola (1 km)
 Salti (8 km)
 Leccia Torta (1 km)
 Porraghia (8 km)
 Valdu a u Mulinu (4 km)
 Callane (3 km)
 Tettole (3 km)
 Corti Maio (2 km)
 Parata u a Carcu (2 km)
 Vaccaia (2 km)
 Perchia (3 km)
 Pedilama (1 km)
 Capina (2 km)
 Vaccario (1 km)
Agnani (1 km)
Fiumicellu (7 km)
 Lavandaio (2 km)
 Morello (5 km)
 Pilocaccio (2 km)
 Stollu (4 km)
 Campucassu (4 km)
 Piedi Gatta (2 km)
 di Pétricali (3 km)
 Ficapenta (3 km)
 Carpiniccia (3 km)
 Codiglione (1 km)
 Furnelli (2 km)
 Canne (2 km)
 Spelonca (2 km)

Notes

Sources

Rivers of Haute-Corse
Rivers of France
Coastal basins of the Mediterranean Sea in Corsica